Isabella Campbell, Countess Cawdor of Castlemartin (née Lady Isabella Rachel Stanhope; born 1 October 1966) is a British fashion editor, stylist, and interior decorator. She was a former fashion editor at British Vogue.

Early life and family 
Lady Isabella Stanhope was born on 1 October 1966 to William Stanhope, 11th Earl of Harrington and his third wife, Priscilla Margaret Cubitt. Her maternal great-grandfather was Henry Cubitt, 2nd Baron Ashcombe. She grew up in Ballingarry, County Limerick, Ireland.

Career 
Lady Isabella worked as a fashion editor for British Vogue. She also worked as a designer for Holland & Holland, partnering with Stella Tennant.

After her marriage, she worked in freelance projects with Bruce Weber, Mario Testino, and Annie Leibovitz. She also works as a landlord and property manager over the rental properties on the Cawdor family estate. She runs a location and production company from Cawdor, organising photo shoots for magazines, ordering props for photo shoots, and casting actors for films.

Personal life 
Lady Isabella married Colin Campbell, 7th Earl Cawdor on 21 October 1994 at St. Nicholas Church, Adare. They live in Cawdor Castle and have four children:
 Lady Jean Campbell (b. 1997)
 James Chester Campbell, Viscount Emlyn (b. 1998)
 Lady Eleanor Campbell (b. 2000)
 Lady Beatrice Campbell (b. 2004)

In 2007, Vogue considered Lady Cawdor and her husband to be among the best-dressed couples in the United Kingdom.

References 

Living people
1966 births
Cawdor
British interior designers
British magazine editors
Isabella
Daughters of British earls
Fashion stylists
People from County Limerick
Isabella
Vogue (magazine) people
Women magazine editors